Bazaar supermarkets is a discount supermarket and Cash & Carry chain in Greece. As of 2019, it operates around 190 retail stores and 10 Cash & Carry stores. It belongs to the Veroukas Group A.E.

See also

List of supermarket chains in Greece

References

Supermarkets of Greece